Jangjeon is a dong, or precinct, in Geumjeong-gu, Busan, South Korea.  A heavily populated district, it is located between the slopes of Geumjeongsan and the valley of the Oncheoncheon.  It is bounded to the south by Oncheon-dong in Dongnae-gu and to the north by Guseo-dong.  Due to its large population, Jangjeon-dong is divided into three "administrative dong," Jangjeon 1, 2, and 3-dong.

Jangjeon-dong is tightly connected to the Busan transit grid, with Busan Subway Line 1 making two stops, at Pusan National University Station and Jangjeon-dong station.  Jangjeon-dong is home to Pusan National University, a major university in Busan, and to a popular shopping and restaurant district.

The name jangjeon literally means "long arrows."  It is believed that the original inhabitants of the Jangjeon village were arrowsmiths, making long arrow shafts from the bamboo groves that still flourish on the slopes of Geumjeongsan.

See also
Geography of South Korea
Administrative divisions of South Korea

Geumjeong District
Neighbourhoods in Busan